The Altenberg bobsleigh, luge, and skeleton track is a venue in Germany for bobsleigh, luge, and skeleton. Located in Saxony in eastern Germany, it is northwest of Altenberg, near the border with the Czech Republic.

History
Altenberg raced bobsleigh as early as 1908 on a natural track going downhill. By the late 1970s, the East Germans were already successful in luge, and had increasing success in bobsleigh. This included a total of six Winter Olympic medals in bobsleigh in 1976 and 1980, along with five world bobsleigh championship medals between 1977 and 1979. In order to increase East Germany's effort to win more bobsleigh and luge medals both at the Winter Olympics and their respective sport's world championships, a track was constructed. The track at Altenberg was constructed under the order of then-Stasi (Ministry for State Security in East Germany) Minister Erich Mielke.

Construction began in 1981 under restrictive access with a wire fence and armed patrols from the Landstreitkräfte (East German National People's Army) on orders from Mielke. By 1983, construction was completed though trials were less than successful. This would result in turns 11 and 12 being destroyed and rebuilt. It was not until late 1986 when the track was officially completed with homologation received from both the International Bobsleigh and Tobogganing Federation (FIBT) and the International Luge Federation (FIL) the following year. The track was part of the training used by SG Dynamo Zinnwald/ SV Dynamo until the 1990 German reunification. Men's skeleton first competed in 1992.

In 1997, the women's single luge start house was created before turn three after being shared with the men's double luge start house before turn seven from 1989 to 1996. Women's skeleton first began competition in 1999 while women's bobsleigh first started the following year. An 18th curve was modified during the summer of 2007 with the addition of a finish curve and straightaway.

Over the weekend of 1–3 February 2008, the track hosted the 200th FIL Luge World Cup event, which began in December 1977. The track was awarded the 2012 FIL World Luge Championships at the 2008 FIL Congress in Calgary, Canada, on 28 June of that year, following Whistler's bid withdrawal. Refurbishment of the track for the 2012 World Luge Championships was projected to cost €1.4 million, which included modernizing the electronics and refrigeration system and renovation of the women's and junior start houses.

Track technical details
There a total of fifty sensors located throughout the track with its staff contacted at a moment's notice if anything bad occurs.

Statistics

Turns 1, 2, 11–14, and 18 have no names listed in the track diagram. Turn 18 is followed by a Bremshang, a finish/braking straight.

Championships hosted
FIBT World Championships: 1991 (bobsleigh), 1994 (men's skeleton), 2000 (men's bobsleigh), 2008
FIL European Luge Championships: 2002, 2016
FIL World Luge Championships: 1996 2012

References

External links
FIBT track profile - Click on video for ride down the track. It will show the bobsleigh-skeleton part intersecting with the men's single luge track prior to turn one, the women's single luge track prior to turn three, and the men's doubles luge track prior to turn seven.
FIL-Luge track profile
Official website 
RSBV.de profile with the track. 

Bobsleigh, luge, and skeleton tracks in Germany
Sports venues in Saxony
bobsleigh